NVI or nvi may refer to:
 nvi, a text editor
 Avial NV, an airline 
 no value indicator, a non-denominated postage stamp
 Navoiy Airport, in Uzbekistan 
 Negative volume index, a financial analysis method
 Nationale Vliegtuig Industrie or National Aircraft Industry, a Dutch aircraft manufacturer, see Frederick Koolhoven 
 Nueva Versión Internacional, a Spanish language version of the New International Version of the Bible
 Non-virtual interface pattern, a computer software design pattern